Bloodlust is the sixth studio album by American heavy metal band Body Count, released March 31, 2017, by Century Media Records. It is their first recorded with new hype man Little Ice, the son of frontman Ice-T.

In its first week, it debuted at number 3 in the UK Rock and Metal Chart. The track "Here I Go Again" is a re-recording of a demo track from frontman Ice-T's Return of the Real sessions. The track "Black Hoodie" was nominated for Best Metal Performance at the 60th Annual Grammy Awards. The second track, "No Lives Matter", addresses the role of race in social inequality. "All Love Is Lost" is about husbands who are having an affair with their mistresses behind their wives' backs and features Max Cavalera on guitar and vocals. The video features actress Kelli Giddish (Ice-T's co-star on Law & Order: Special Victims Unit) playing the role of the vindictive wife who kills her husband because he's cheating on her. The album contains a cover of "Raining Blood" from Slayer; the title was changed to "Raining in Blood" for publishing reasons.

Track listing

Personnel
Ice-T – lead vocals
Ernie C – lead guitar
Juan of the Dead – rhythm guitar
Vincent Price – bass, lead vocals on "Postmortem"
Ill Will – drums
Sean E Sean – sampler, backing vocals
Little Ice – hype man, backing vocals

Guest musicians 
Dave Mustaine – spoken word and lead guitar on "Civil War"
Jason C. Miller – additional backing vocals on "The Ski Mask Way" and "No Lives Matter"
Max Cavalera – guest vocals on "All Love Is Lost"
Randy Blythe – guest vocals on "Walk with Me…"
Jackie Kajzer – additional backing vocals on "No Lives Matter"

Accolades

Charts

References

2017 albums
Body Count (band) albums
Century Media Records albums
Albums produced by Will Putney